Tyrone Township is the name of some places in the U.S. state of Pennsylvania:

Tyrone Township, Adams County, Pennsylvania
Tyrone Township, Blair County, Pennsylvania
Tyrone Township, Perry County, Pennsylvania

See also
Lower Tyrone Township, Fayette County, Pennsylvania
Upper Tyrone Township, Fayette County, Pennsylvania

Pennsylvania township disambiguation pages